Oliver Daemen (born 20 August 2002) is a Dutch space tourist who flew as part of the 20 July 2021, sub-orbital Blue Origin NS-16 spaceflight. At the time of his flight he was 18 years old, and is the youngest person, first teenager, and first person born in the 21st century to travel to space. Daemen is a licensed pilot.

Life and career
Daemen was born in Oisterwijk, Netherlands. He attended the Odulphuslyceum in Tilburg and obtained his high school diploma in 2020. He is enrolled at Utrecht University where he started his studies in Science and Innovation Management in September 2021. 

Daemen's space tourist seat on the New Shepard rocket was secured through an auction, making him Blue Origin's first customer (i.e. a person whose flight was not paid for by Blue Origin) and the 8th person to privately fund their non-professional spaceflight. Initially a different person (who initially remained anonymous but was later announced to have been Justin Sun) had actually won the auction with a $28 million winning bid for the one available seat on NS-16. However, Sun decided to take a future flight, and Blue Origin chose the youngest person from the auction. On 20 July 2021, Daemen became the youngest person to fly in space at 18, succeeding Gherman Titov's multi-orbital record at the age of 25 in 1961.

See also
 Private spaceflight
 Space tourism
 Blue Origind

References

2002 births
Living people
New Shepard passengers
People from Oisterwijk
People who have flown in suborbital spaceflight
Space tourists